The Skillman House, located on Tile Plant Rd. in Cloverport, Kentucky, was built in 1876.  It was listed on the National Register of Historic Places in 1983.

It looks out over the Ohio River.  It is a two-story brick building, with brick laid in common bond, which is Italianate in style.  The listing included six contributing buildings.

References

Houses on the National Register of Historic Places in Kentucky
Italianate architecture in Kentucky
Houses completed in 1876
National Register of Historic Places in Breckinridge County, Kentucky
1876 establishments in Kentucky